Astudillo may refer to:

Astudillo (surname)
Astudillo, Palencia, a municipality in the Spanish autonomous community of Castilla y Leon part of the Province of Palencia
Astudillo Glacier, a glacier of Graham Land, Antarctica